Lake County is a county located in the U.S. state of Colorado. As of the 2020 census, the population was 7,436. The county seat and the only municipality in the county is Leadville. The highest natural point in Colorado and the entire Rocky Mountains is the summit of Mount Elbert in Lake County at  elevation.

History
Lake County was one of the original 17 counties created by the Colorado legislature on November 1, 1861. As originally defined, Lake County included a large portion of western Colorado to the south and west of its present boundaries. The county was named for Twin Lakes.

Placer gold was found at Colorado Gulch in 1863 as part of the Colorado Gold Rush.

Lake County slowly lost territory over the succeeding decades, losing land in its southeast to Saguache County in 1866 and Hinsdale County in 1874; in its southwest to La Plata County in 1874 and San Juan County in 1876, and in its west to Ouray and Gunnison counties in 1877.

With its many reductions in size, Lake County's designated county seat also changed multiple times within just a few years, residing successively in Oro City (from 1861), Lourette (from 1863), Dayton (from 1866), and Granite (from 1868).

By 1878, Lake County had been reduced to an area including only present-day Lake and Chaffee counties. On February 8, 1879, the Colorado legislature renamed Lake County as Carbonate County, although this designation name only lasted for two days, until Chaffee County was split off from Carbonate's southern section on February 10 and the remaining northern portion was redesignated Lake County with its current county seat of Leadville.

Geography
It is the fourth-smallest county in Colorado by area.

Adjacent counties
 Eagle County – north
 Summit County – northeast
 Park County – east
 Chaffee County – south
 Pitkin County – west

Major Highways
  U.S. Highway 24
  State Highway 82
  State Highway 91

In popular culture
The 2013 horror video game Outlast is set in a fictional asylum in Lake County.

Demographics

As of the census of 2000, there were 7,812 people, 2,977 households, and 1,914 families living in the county. The population density was 21 people per square mile (8/km2). There were 3,913 housing units at an average density of 10 per square mile (4/km2). The racial makeup of the county was 77.60% White, 0.18% Black or African American, 1.25% Native American, 0.31% Asian, 0.05% Pacific Islander, 17.99% from other races, and 2.62% from two or more races. 36.14% of the population were Hispanic or Latino of any race.

There were 2,977 households, out of which 33.90% had children under the age of 18 living with them, 50.70% were married couples living together, 8.40% had a female householder with no husband present, and 35.70% were non-families. 26.30% of all households were made up of individuals, and 5.60% had someone living alone who was 65 years of age or older. The average household size was 2.59 and the average family size was 3.15.

In the county, the population was spread out, with 26.90% under the age of 18, 12.80% from 18 to 24, 33.10% from 25 to 44, 20.60% from 45 to 64, and 6.60% who were 65 years of age or older. The median age was 30 years. For every 100 females there were 115.80 males. For every 100 females age 18 and over, there were 116.70 males.

The median income for a household in the county was $37,691, and the median income for a family was $41,652. Males had a median income of $30,977 versus $24,415 for females. The per capita income for the county was $18,524. About 9.50% of families and 12.90% of the population were below the poverty line, including 15.60% of those under age 18 and 6.30% of those age 65 or over.

Politics

Lake County has leaned towards the Democratic Party for most of its history, voting for that party's presidential nominee in every election since 1988.

Communities

City
 Leadville

Census-designated places
 Leadville North
 Twin Lakes

Unincorporated community
 Climax

Ghost Town
 Oro City

Historic sites

 Healy House Museum and Dexter Cabin
 Leadville National Historic District

Recreation

State protected area
 Arkansas Headwaters Recreation Area

National protected areas
 San Isabel National Forest (part)
 Buffalo Peaks Wilderness (part)
 Collegiate Peaks Wilderness (part)
 Holy Cross Wilderness (part)
 Mount Massive Wilderness (part)
 Leadville National Fish Hatchery (part)

Trails
 American Discovery Trail
 Colorado Trail
 Continental Divide National Scenic Trail
 Mineral Belt National Recreation Trail

Scenic byway
 Top of the Rockies National Scenic Byway

See also

 Outline of Colorado
 Index of Colorado-related articles
 Colorado census statistical areas
 National Register of Historic Places listings in Lake County, Colorado

References

External links
 Lake County Government website
 Colorado County Evolution by Don Stanwyck
 Colorado Historical Society
 Lake County Visitor Center

 

 
Colorado counties
1861 establishments in Colorado Territory
Populated places established in 1861